The 1954 All-Atlantic Coast Conference football team consists of American football players chosen by the Associated Press (AP) and the United Press (UP) as the best players at each position from the players on teams participating in the Atlantic Coast Conference ("ACC") during the 1954 college football season.  

The 1954 Duke Blue Devils football team won the ACC championship and defeated Nebraska in the 1955 Orange Bowl. Duke placed three players on the All-ACC team: quarterback Jerry Barger; halfback Bob Pascal; and tackle Fred Campbell.

The 1954 Maryland Terrapins football team finished in second place and was ranked No. 8 in the final AP poll. The Terrapins also placed three players on the All-ACC team: halfback Ronnie Waller; fullback Dick Bielski; and end Bill Walker.

Bob Bartholomew of Wake Forest was the only unanimous selection by all 43 AP voters.

All-Atlantic Coast selections

Ends
 Ed Stowers, Wake Forest (AP-1, UP-1)
 Bill Walker, Maryland (AP-1)
 Scott Jackson, Clemson (UP-1)

Tackles
 Bob Bartholomew, Wake Forest (AP-1, UP-1)
 Roland Perdue, North Carolina (AP-1)
 Fred Campbell, Duke (UP-1)

Guards
 Frank Mincevich, South Carolina (AP-1, UP-1)
 John Polzer, Virginia (AP-1, UP-1)

Centers
 Leon Cunningham, South Carolina (AP-1, UP-1)

Backs
 Jerry Barger, Duke (AP-1 [QB], UP-1)
 Ronnie Waller, Maryland (AP-1 [HB], UP-1 [HB])
 Dick Bielski, Maryland (AP-1 [FB], UP-1 [FB])
 Bob Pascal, Duke (AP-1 [HB])
 George Marinkov, NC State (UP-1 [HB])

Key

See also
1954 College Football All-America Team

References

All-Atlantic Coast Conference football team
All-Atlantic Coast Conference football teams